John Ussher may refer to:

 John Ussher, publisher in 1571 of Aibidil Gaoidheilge agus Caiticiosma, the first book printed in Ireland in the Irish language
 John Ussher (died 1741) (c. 1682–1741), Irish MP for Carrick
 John Ussher (died 1749) (1703–1749), Irish MP for Dungarvan
 John Ussher (1730–1796), Irish MP for Innistiogue
 John Ussher (priest) (died 1835), Irish Anglican priest
 Johnny Ussher (1830–1879), Canadian gold commissioner

See also
John Usher (disambiguation)
Ussher (surname)